All Things Must Pass is a 1970 album by George Harrison.

"All Things Must Pass" may also refer to:

Music 
"All Things Must Pass" (song), the 1970 album's title track; first recorded by Billy Preston under the name "All Things (Must) Pass"
"All Things Must Pass", song by The Pooh Sticks from their album Optimistic Fool (1995)
"All Things Must Pass", song by Lynch Mob from their EP Syzygy (1998)
"All Things Must Pass", song by The Waterboys from their CD single "Everybody Takes a Tumble" (2007)
"All Things Must Pass", song by The Jesus and Mary Chain from the Heroes soundtrack (2008)
"All Things Must Pass", song by Waterfront from their album Ghosts of the Good (2011)

Film and television 
 "All Things Must Pass", episode of the television series Defiance (2014)
 All Things Must Pass: The Rise and Fall of Tower Records, documentary by Colin Hanks (2015)

See also
"All Things Come to Pass", song by The Babies (2010)